Kanakdia is a Union of Bauphal Upazila, Patuakhali; in the Division of Barisal, Bangladesh.

Geography   
The area of ​​Konakdia Union is 6,941 acres.

Administrative structure 
This Union Parishad is under Bauphal Upazila. Administrative activities of this union are under the jurisdiction of Bauphal police station. It is part of Jatiya Sangsad Constituency No. 112 Patuakhali-2.

Constituency Area

 Jayghora
 Birpasha 
 Amirabad
 Jhilna - Kalta
 Hogla
 Narayanpasha
 Kumvokhali - Kathikul
 Ayla
 Kanakdia

Population data  
According to the Bangladesh Bureau of Statistics, the total population of Konkadia Union is 19,519. Of these, 7,624 are males and 10,795 are females. Total families are 4,461.

References 

Unions of Bauphal Upazila
Unions of Patuakhali District